The Danjiangkou Dam is a concrete gravity dam on the Han river near Danjiangkou in Hubei Province, China. The original dam was constructed between 1958 and 1973. The dam creates a large Danjiangkou Reservoir.

In the 21st century, the Danjiangkou Dam became part of the South-North Water Transfer Project. In 2005-2009, its height was raised in order to increase the reservoir's capacity.

Heightening

The dam's power plant also contains 6 x 150 MW turbine generators for an installed capacity of 900 MW. This will increase with the heightened reservoir.

See also

List of power stations in China

References

Dams in China
Hydroelectric power stations in Hubei
Gravity dams
Dams completed in 1973
Shiyan